Arturo Díaz Mendoza (March 23, 1952 – August 21, 2018) was a Mexican professional wrestler who performed under the ring name Villano III (in Spanish Villano Tercero). Díaz was a second-generation wrestler, son of luchador Ray Mendoza and the father of professional wrestlers Villano III Jr. and El Hijo del Villano III himself. All five of the Díaz brothers used the Villano name; José de Jesús (Villano I), José Alfredo (Villano II), Tomás (Villano IV) and Raymundo (Villano V). Of the five Villanos, Arturo was considered the most successful in terms of championship and Lucha de Apuesta (bet match) wins as well as the most talented luchador in the family. He retired from wrestling in 2015 due to health issues stemming from wrestling. A few days after his death, he was inducted in the AAA Hall of Fame.

During his 35 year career, Arturo Díaz was one of the featured performers for the Universal Wrestling Association, and for all the all major Mexican wrestling promotions such as Consejo Mundial de Lucha Libre and AAA as well as numerous notable smaller Mexican promotions like International Wrestling Revolution Group. Díaz was an enmascarado, or masked wrestler, up until 2000 where he lost to Atlantis and had to unmask as a result. The match against Atlantis was later voted "Match of the Year" in the Wrestling Observer Newsletter year-end awards. In contrast one of his last matches ever, at Triplemanía XXIII was voted the "worst match of the year" in 2015.

Professional wrestling career
Arturo Díaz was born into a wrestling family; his father, Ray Mendoza, became a successful luchador when Arturo was very young. His two older brothers, José de Jesús and José Alfredo, had begun wrestling in early 1969 when Arturo was just 17 years old. Arturo was trained both by his father and by Felipe Ham Lee, a family friend, while also getting a degree in physical education in case professional wrestling did not work out for him. His debut was on January 29, 1970, earlier than expected as he was asked to replace someone who did not show up for a match. For the first match he was billed as "Ray Rosas" (Ray after his father and "Rosas" after the color of his wrestling attire) and worked without a mask.

After his initial match he began wrestling under various enmascarado (masked) characters such as Pulpo Blanco (Spanish for "White Octopus") and Mancha Roja ("Red Stain"), in part to not reveal that he was the son of Ray Mendoza. At one point he competed under the name "Búfalo Salvaje" ("Savage Buffalo"), a name also used by his older brothers early in their careers when they worked as Búfalo Salvaje I and II. After several short-lived names, Arturo began wrestling as Rokambole, a name he would use for several years. The name Rokambole would later be used by his younger brother Raymundo as well. In late 1970 or early 1971, his older brothers began wrestling as Villano I and Villano II and soon established that as their permanent identity, creating what would later turn into a family tradition.

Universal Wrestling Association (1973–1994)

In 1973 Arturo's father and older brothers finally deemed him experienced enough to use the Villano name, taking the name Villano III (Villano Tercero). In 1975 Arturo's father joined with wrestling promoter Francisco Flores and investor Benjamín Mora Jr. to form a new wrestling promotion called Universal Wrestling Association, which was in direct competition with the company Ray Mendoza and Flores had worked for up until that point, Empresa Mexicana de Lucha Libre (EMLL). One of the reasons behind the split was that Mendoza felt that EMLL was not giving his sons enough opportunities in the ring. All three Villanos followed their father to the newly formed UWA. While his brothers worked as a tag team, Villano III became a singles competitor and was pushed as one of its top stars, due to his father's influence and Vilano being the Vilanos' most talented wrestler. On December 14, 1975, Villano III became the first ever UWA World Welterweight Champion by winning a tournament. Over the next couple of years, Villano III defended the championship in several high-profile, main event matches, earning favorable reviews from both fans and reporters. His run with the welterweight title lasted until May 29, 1977, where he lost to El Solar. Following the title loss, Villano III moved from the welterweight division (with a maximum weight of ) to the light heavyweight division (with a maximum of ). On March 1, 1981, he defeated Fishman to win the UWA World Light Heavyweight Championship, a title his father had won previously as well. Villano III lost the title back to Fishman 140 days later, ending the first of his two reigns with that championship.

In 1982 Villano III started a storyline feud against Los Misioneros de la Muerte ("The Missionaries of Death"; El Signo, El Texano and Negro Navarro), that would lead to Villano III becoming a tecnico (a face, those that portray the good guys in wrestling). As Villano III became more and more popular with the fans and the UWA officials decided to make him a "technico", using the hated Los Misioneros trio to that end. After his "tecnico" turn Villano III joined up with El Solitario and Aníbal to form a trio called Los Tres Caballeros ("The Three Gentlemen"), who would go on to main event a series of sold-out UWA shows. His first major opponent after the turn was Perro Aguayo, starting a long-running, intense feud over the WWF Light Heavyweight Championship that the UWA promoted at the time. On March 20, 1983, Villano III defeated Aguayo to win the WWF Light Heavyweight Championship, beginning the first of seven reigns for Villano III, tied with Aguayo for most reigns with that title. His first reign lasted 140 days before Aguayo regained the title. The feud between the two also saw Villano III defeat Aguayo in a Lucha de Apuesta, hair vs. mask match, on August 21, 1983.

In 1985 Villano III defeated Gran Hamada to win the WWF Light Heavyweight Title for a second time. Villano III's second title reign lasted 826 days, which is the longest of any WWF Light Heavyweight Champion in its history. During the mid-1980s his two younger brothers began using the names "Villano IV" and "Villano V", often teaming with Villano I. Over the following years, Villano III traded the WWF Light Heavyweight Championship with Perro Aguayo, Rambo, and, Sangre Chicana. In 1991 Villano III began working against a young Canadian known as Pegasus Kid, sent to Mexico by New Japan Pro-Wrestling (NJPW) to train and gain experience. Villano III and Pegasus Kid had a series of matches throughout 1991, including Pegasus Kid winning the WWF Light Heavyweight Title on March 3, 1991. By late 1991. Pegasus Kid's learning excursion to Mexico came to an end, but not before Villano III defeated him in a Lucha de Apuesta match, forcing him to unmask and reveal his real name: Chris Benoit. Villano III's seventh and last reign with the WWF Light Heavyweight Championship began on July 18, 1994, when he defeated El Signo. He held the title until January 1995 when the UWA closed and Villano III vacated the title with which he had been closely associated for more than ten years.

AAA (1995–1998)
In 1995 the UWA was forced to close down, leaving Los Villanos without a home base for the first time in their careers. The brothers soon signed with Antonio Peña's AAA and began working for the promotion as a trios group, marking Villano III's transition from being primarily a singles wrestler to working more trios matches.  In March 1996 Los Villanos defeated Cien Caras, Heavy Metal, and Latin Lover to become the inaugural holders of the AAA Americas Trios Championship, a title created by Peña specifically for Los Villanos as AAA did not have an active trios championship before. The team held the championship until November 19, 1996, when they lost to Los Oficiales (Guardia, Oficial, and Vigilante), but regained the championship less than two months later. Los Villanos also became the first ever Mexican National Atómicos Champions, teaming with Pierroth Jr. to win the four-man team exclusive championship. By mid-1996, Villano IV and Villano V had begun working for the US-based World Championship Wrestling (WCW). In 1997 most of the wrestlers that worked for WCW split off from AAA to form Promo Azteca, which included the Villano brothers. By leaving AAA Los Villanos vacated both the Americas Trios title and the Mexican National Atómicos Championship.

World Wrestling Council / Independent circuit (1997–1998)
After leaving AAA, Villano III toured Puerto Rico several times in 1997 and 1998, working for the World Wrestling Council (WWC). On November 27, 1997, Villano III defeated Ricky Santana to win the WWC Puerto Rican Championship to start his tour with WWC. Two days later Santana regained the championship before Villano III regained it on December 21. Villano did not work in Puerto Rico between January and April, only returning to the island to lose the Puerto Rican championship to Glamour Boy Shane on WWC's 25th Anniversary Show.

Villano III also worked on the independent circuit after leaving AAA, as well as making sporadic appearances for both Consejo Mundial de Lucha Libre (CMLL) and Promo Azteca at the time. On July 18, 1998, Villano III was one of 32 wrestlers putting their masks on the line in a Ruleta de la Muerte ("Roulette of death") tournament where the losing teams advance and in the end the final team would face off in a Lucha de Apuestas match. Villano III and his partner Shocker lost to Rayo de Jalisco Jr. and Mil Máscaras in the first round, but defeated El Hijo del Santo and Guerrero del Futuro in the second round to preserve their masks.

Consejo Mundial de Lucha Libre (1999–2002)
In late 1998 Villano III began working almost exclusively for CMLL. On December 25, 1999, Villano III and Super Astro teamed up to wrestle against Lizmark and Fishman in a Relevos Suicidas. When Villano III and Super Astro lost they were forced to wrestle against each other in a Lucha de Apuesta match. In the end, Villano III won yet another Apuesta match, forcing Super Astro to unmask.

On November 22, 1999, Villano III defeated Atlantis to win the CMLL World Light Heavyweight Championship. The title change was just one of the highlights of a long-running feud between Atlantis and Villano III, a feud that also included III's younger brothers Villano IV and Villano V who no longer worked for WCW. On March 17, 2000, at CMLL's 2000 Juicio Final event, Atlantis won his biggest Apuesta victory to date as he defeated and then unmasked Villano III in a match that was voted the Wrestling Observer 2000 Match of the Year. In 2010 Súper Luchas Magazine suggested that this may have been the lucha libre match of the decade for the 2000s.

Unmasked
A few months later Villano III, IV, and V defeated Escuadron de la Muerte ("The Death Squadron"; Cyborg Cop, Maniac Cop, and Vader Cop) to win the IWRG Intercontinental Trios Championship. Los Villano still worked for CMLL but they had a talent sharing arrangement with International Wrestling Revolution Group (IWRG) that allowed Los Villanos to work for IWRG as well. Villano III's CMLL World Light Heavyweight Championship reign ended on September 7, 2001, when he was pinned by Shocker. Following the title loss, Los Villanos worked more infrequently for CMLL, taking bookings both in IWRG and on the Mexican independent circuit as well. On March 21, 2002, Villano III's last title reign ended when Los Villanos were stripped of the IWRG Trios title as Villano V was injured and unable to defend the title. On July 30, 2005, Villano III teamed up with rookie wrestler Gallo Tapado Jr. for IWRG's La Copa Black Shadow tournament. The duo defeated El Matemático and Black Man Jr. and then the team of Rambo and Bobby Lee Jr.; Brazo de Plata Jr. and Brazo de Oro to win the tournament.

In the latter half of the 2000s, Villano IV and V worked for CMLL on a regular basis, while Villano III's CMLL appearances were more sporadic, wrestling mainly on the independent circuit. Villano III frequently appeared in Lucha de Apuesta matches, having won the hair of Scorpio Jr. (twice), Brazo de Oro, Brazo de Platino and El Cobarde II during that time period, only losing one Apuesta match; losing his hair to L.A. Park in a multi-man match on May 5, 2007. Around 2010, Díaz's wrestling appearances were reduced as he was dealing with both age and ring related ailments and worked a much lighter schedule. 2013 saw him work 11 confirmed matches, and 2014 he only competed in 7.

In May 2015, Arturo Díaz announced that he would retire from active competition due to several knee injuries and diminishing eyesight leaving him unable to compete competitively. Afterward Díaz agreed to another match, teaming with his younger brothers to take on Los Psycho Circus (Psycho Clown, Monster Clown and Murder Clown) at Triplemanía XXIII, AAA's biggest show of the year, promoting it as Villano III's retirement match after a 45 year career. While Los Villanos won the match, the age of the Villanos and deteriorating health of Villano III and V led to many mistakes in a heavily criticized match, that was voted the "worst match of 2015" by the readers of the Wrestling Observer. Despite his retirement announcements and ailing health Díaz did work one match in both 2016 and 2017.

Personal life
Arturo Díaz Mendoza was the third son and third child overall of José Díaz Velazquez and Guadalupe Mendoza. His brothers, like himself all became wrestlers: José de Jesús (Villano I),  José Alfredo (Villano II),  Arturo, Raymundo Mendoza Jr. (Villano V),  and Tomás (Villano IV). Lupita Mendoza died in 1986, his second oldest brother José Alfredo died in 1989, his oldest brother José de Jesús died in 2002, and his father José Diaz died on April 16, 2003. Díaz was adamant that his sons get a good education instead of becoming wrestlers, wishing that they become lawyers or doctors as he wanted to spare them his own physical suffering. Once he realized that his two oldest sons had begun wrestling under masks he agreed to train them and aid in their careers. He was also instrumental in training the rest of his sons, although he insisted they both get college degrees before they were allowed to begin wrestling. Since his youngest son Tomás finished his education first he became known as "Villano IV" while Raymundo, the second youngest son, became "Villano V".

Díaz was married to Luz Lorena Velarde Murillo, who was a professional wrestler for many years, working under the name "La Infernal". Together they have at least two children, two sons who wrestle under the names Villano III Jr. and El Hijo del Villano III. His nephews (sons of Raymundo) are also wrestlers, known as Rokambole Jr. and Villano V Jr. On March 17, 2017 CMLL honored Villano III as part of their annual Homenaje a Dos Leyendas ("Homage to two legends") show, their version of the Hall of Fame.

Arturo Díaz died of a cerebral infarction on August 21, 2018, after dealing with health issues, including complications from a stroke earlier in the year. Four days later, at Triplemanía XXVI, AAA inducted Arturo Díaz into the AAA Hall of Fame, honoring his career and his legacy with his sons El Hijo del Villano III and Villano III Jr. accepting the honor on his father's behalf. CMLL also paid tribute to Villano III during their first Super Viernes show after Díaz's death, with Villano IV, V, El Hijo del Villano III and Villano III Jr. all acknowledged and honored during the show as wrestlers Mephisto and L.A. Park both wearing wrestling tights/mask resembling what Villano III wore during his career.

Professional wrestling persona and style

In the 1970s and 1980s, Villano III was one of the top box office draws for the UWA, and has been referred to as one of the biggest stars in the history of lucha libre. A testament to his in-ring talent was the fact that he was often selected as the opponent for various top light heavyweight wrestlers from around the world. The 2000 Lucha de Apuestas match against Atlantis was voted the "Match of the Year" in the Wrestling Observer Newsletter year-end awards by the readers, the only Mexican match to ever earn this distinction.

Villano III's in-ring style focused more on fast action and explosive moves that looked realistic over the high flying style normally associated with light heavyweight wrestlers, although he would perform dives out of the ring and off the top rope. His in-ring speed helped make his La magistral cradle so effective, he was able to apply it to an opponent instantly. Over the years he often used a DDT (where he would drive the opponent's head into the mat) and then swiftly transition into locking his " Media Cerrajera" submission hold (a Standing figure-four leglock, Chickenwing submission) to win matches. In a May 2008 article on Villano III he claimed to have won approximately 140 masks. and 100 hair in his career, with the article itself outlining details for 77 Luchas de Apuestas matches. The Wrestling Observer stated that he had 58 successful Apuestas matches prior to his mask loss.

Arturo, as well as all other Díaz family members who have used the "Villano" name, have all worn the same distinctive mask. Originally on a black base with a red "X" across the face and golden outlines around the eye holes, similar to "bandit mask" worn by criminals in cartoons. Over the years, Los Villanos have changed their color schemes, such as red, blue, purple and most noticeably pink versions of the mask and tights. The pink color scheme earned Villano III the nickname "Pantera Rosa", or "Pink Panther" with the fans, leading to Villano III often using The Pink Panther Theme by Henry Mancini as his entrance music.

Championships and accomplishments
AAA / Lucha Libre AAA Worldwide
AAA Americas Trios Championship (2 time) – with Villano IV and Villano V
Mexican National Atómicos Championship (1 time) – with Villano IV, Villano V and Pierroth Jr.
AAA Hall of Fame (Class of 2018)
Arena Naucalpan
Arena Naucalpan Light Heavyweight Championship (1 time)
Arena Naucalpan Middleweight Championship (1 time)
Consejo Mundial de Lucha Libre
CMLL World Light Heavyweight Championship (1 time)
Mexican National Trios Championship (1 time) – with Dos Caras and Villano IV
International Wrestling Revolution Group
IWRG Intercontinental Trios Championship (1 time) – with Villano IV and Villano V
La Copa Black Shadow – with Gallo Tapado Jr.
Pro Wrestling Illustrated
PWI ranked him #64 of the 500 best singles wrestlers of the PWI 500 in 2001
PWI ranked him #215 of the top 500 singles wrestlers of the PWI Years in 2003
Universal Wrestling Association
UWA World Junior Heavyweight Championship (1 time)
UWA World Junior Light Heavyweight Championship (1 time)
UWA World Light Heavyweight Championship (2 times)
UWA World Welterweight Championship (1 time)
WWF Light Heavyweight Championship (7 times)
World Wrestling Council
WWC Puerto Rico Heavyweight Championship (2 time)
World Wrestling Association
WWA World Trios Championship (1 time) – with Villano IV and Villano V
Wrestling Observer Newsletter awards
Match of the Year (2000) 
Worst Match of the Year (2015) with Villano IV and Villano V vs. Monster Clown, Murder Clown and Psycho Clown on August 9
Wrestling Observer Newsletter Hall of Fame (Class of 2019)

Luchas de Apuestas record

Footnotes

References

1952 births
2018 deaths
Masked wrestlers
Mexican male professional wrestlers
Professional wrestlers from Mexico City
Mexican National Atómicos Champions
Mexican National Trios Champions
CMLL World Light Heavyweight Champions
UWA World Welterweight Champions
WWC Puerto Rico Champions
UWA World Junior Heavyweight Champions
UWA World Light Heavyweight Champions